Bohdan Romanovych Shust (born 4 March 1986) is a professional Ukrainian retired footballer.

Career

Karpaty Lviv
Shust started his professional career in FC Karpaty Lviv in 2004. By the end of his time there, he had played 19 league matches for the club.

Shakhtar Donetsk
Halfway through the 2004–05 season Shust transferred to Ukrainian giants Shakhtar Donetsk. Following the 2007–2008 season, he only made 5 appearances and conceded 6 goals. In the 2008–09 season he only played one game for the team as a second-half substitute.

Metalurh Donetsk
In the summer of 2009 Shust transferred on a loan deal to Metalurh Donetsk.

International career
He was a part of Ukraine's 2006 World Cup Squad as well as a member of the Ukraine national under-21 football team.

Honours

Club

Shakhtar Donetsk
 Ukrainian Premier League: 2004–05, 2005–06, 2007–08
 Ukrainian Cup: 2007–08
 Ukrainian Super Cup: 2008
 UEFA Cup: 2008–09

See also
 2005 FIFA World Youth Championship squads#Ukraine

External links
 
 
 Profile at Official Shakhtar website

1986 births
Living people
People from Sudova Vyshnia
Ukrainian footballers
Association football goalkeepers
Ukraine youth international footballers
Ukraine international footballers
Ukraine under-21 international footballers
FC Karpaty Lviv players
FC Karpaty-2 Lviv players
FC Karpaty-3 Lviv players
FC Shakhtar Donetsk players
FC Metalurh Donetsk players
FC Zorya Luhansk players
FC Mariupol players
FC Metalist Kharkiv players
FC Volyn Lutsk players
FC Vorskla Poltava players
FC Inhulets Petrove players
Ukrainian Premier League players
Ukrainian First League players
Ukrainian Second League players
2006 FIFA World Cup players
Sportspeople from Lviv Oblast